Jetze Doorman (2 July 1881 – 28 February 1931) was a Dutch fencer. He won four Olympic bronze medals. He also competed in the modern pentathlon at the 1912 Summer Olympics.

Doorman won the European Champion in Paris in 1907. This victory caused that the Netherlands had to organize the championships the next year and due to that the Dutch national fencing association, now called "Koninklijke Nederlandse Algemene Schermbond" (KNAS) was established.

References

External links
 

1881 births
1931 deaths
Dutch male fencers
Dutch male modern pentathletes
Olympic fencers of the Netherlands
Olympic modern pentathletes of the Netherlands
Fencers at the 1906 Intercalated Games
Fencers at the 1908 Summer Olympics
Fencers at the 1912 Summer Olympics
Fencers at the 1920 Summer Olympics
Fencers at the 1924 Summer Olympics
Modern pentathletes at the 1912 Summer Olympics
Olympic bronze medalists for the Netherlands
Olympic medalists in fencing
Sportspeople from Friesland
People from Gaasterlân-Sleat
Medalists at the 1912 Summer Olympics
Medalists at the 1920 Summer Olympics
Medalists at the 1924 Summer Olympics
20th-century Dutch people